Danceyard Hollow is a valley in Laclede County in the U.S. state of Missouri.

Danceyard Hollow was named for a clearing where Indians were said to have held ritual dances.

References

Valleys of Laclede County, Missouri
Valleys of Missouri